Karin Viard (born 24 January 1966) is a multi-award-winning French actress.  She made her film debut in Tatie Danielle in 1990. She has appeared in films such as Delicatessen, L'Emploi du temps, Adultère, mode d'emploi and La parenthèse enchantée.

Viard was a member of the 2003 Cannes Film Festival jury.

Life and career
Viard was educated at the Lycée Pierre Corneille in Rouen.

Viard has won two César Awards.  The first for Best Actress for her role in Haut les cœurs! and the second for Best Supporting Actress for Embrassez qui vous voudrez. She has been nominated for the César Awards 13 times.

Viard has also won the Best Actress award at the Montréal World Film Festival for her performance in Le Rôle de sa vie.

Theater

Filmography

References

External links

Karin Viard at allcine.com (in French)

French film actresses
French stage actresses
French television actresses
Living people
1966 births
Actors from Rouen
Best Actress César Award winners
Best Supporting Actress César Award winners
Best Actress Lumières Award winners
Lycée Pierre-Corneille alumni
Knights of the Ordre national du Mérite
20th-century French actresses
21st-century French actresses